Peckleton is a small village and civil parish located in the Hinckley and Bosworth district of Leicestershire, England. The villages of Kirkby Mallory and Stapleton also form part of the parish. Thus, according to the 2001 census, the parish had a population of 1,077, falling slightly to 1,067 at the 2011 census.   Due east of the village is Peckleton Common, adjacent to The Glebe Fisheries, an angling centre of excellence completed in 1996. The local church, St Mary Magdalene, is located just south of the village centre.

Notable residents of Peckleton include George Vincent (MP), heir (through his mother) to the Moton family which held the manor of Peckleton for centuries; and descendants of Charles Henry Bennett, illustrator to Charles Darwin and Lewis Carroll.

References

External links

Civil parishes in Leicestershire
Villages in Leicestershire